Linda Isle is a part of the Lower Bay of Newport Beach, California. In 1954, Linda Isle became the last island to be incorporated into the city of Newport Beach, and it was in this period that the entire city, including the islands, began to change from a resort to a residential community. Linda Island is laid out in the shape of a horseshoe, and each home has its own dock. The island is not accessible to the public.

Notable early residents included Gary Primm, along with his yacht the "Prima Donna", which was a notable fixture for many years. Other notable Linda Island residents also included Todd "Doc" Raleigh.

See also
History of Newport Beach
Balboa Island
List of islands of California

References

Linda Isle

Balboa Island

Coordinates on Wikidata
Neighborhoods in Newport Beach, California
Islands of Newport Beach, California
Islands of Southern California
Islands of California